Mongphu or Mongpho is a Lolo-Burmese language of Yunnan, China spoken in Lisa 里洒, Guangnan County and in Zhilun 值伦, Upper Zhemei 上者梅, Lower Zhemei 下者梅, and Muyang 木杨 villages of Funing County, Yunnan. There are several hundred speakers. It is likely most closely related to Maza and Mango.

References

Mondzish languages
Languages of China